St. Augustine is a village in Knox County, Illinois, United States. The population was 120 at the 2010 census, down from 152 at the 2000 census. It is part of the Galesburg Micropolitan Statistical Area.

Geography
St. Augustine is located in the southwest corner of Knox County at  (40.719523, -90.409832). The southern boundary of the village follows the Fulton county line. To the south IL 41 leads  to Bushnell. Illinois Route 116 follows the northern border of the village, leading east  to London Mills and west  to Roseville.

Demographics

As of the census of 2000, there were 152 people, 68 households, and 43 families residing in the village. The racial makeup of the village was 100.00% White.

There were 68 households, out of which 19.1% had children under the age of 18 living with them, 54.4% were married couples living together, 5.9% had a female householder with no husband present, and 35.3% were non-families. 27.9% of all households were made up of individuals, and 14.7% had someone living alone who was 65 years of age or older. The average household size was 2.24 and the average family size was 2.75.

In the village, the population was spread out, with 18.4% under the age of 18, 8.6% from 18 to 24, 20.4% from 25 to 44, 27.0% from 45 to 64, and 25.7% who were 65 years of age or older. The median age was 47 years. For every 100 females, there were 83.1 males. For every 100 females age 18 and over, there were 85.1 males.

The median income for a household in the village was $34,375, and the median income for a family was $35,357. Males had a median income of $27,500 versus $20,313 for females. The per capita income for the village was $15,549. About 4.3% of families and 5.6% of the population were below the poverty line, including none of those under the age of eighteen or sixty five or over.

References

Villages in Illinois
Villages in Knox County, Illinois
Galesburg, Illinois micropolitan area